Chauncey Milton "Chance" Vought (February 26, 1890 in Long Island, New York – July 25, 1930) was an American aviation pioneer and engineer, who was the co-founder of the Lewis and Vought Corporation with Birdseye Lewis.

Born on Long Island, New York, he attended the Pratt Institute, New York University (where he joined Kappa Sigma), and the University of Pennsylvania. He died from sepsis. He was inducted into the National Aviation Hall of Fame in 1989.

References

External links
 
Chance Vought at the National Aviation Hall of Fame 
Chance Vought in August 1912 at the controls of a Wright Model B

American aerospace engineers
Aviation pioneers
1890 births
1930 deaths
Chance M. Vought
National Aviation Hall of Fame inductees
People from Long Island
Deaths from sepsis
20th-century American engineers
Pratt Institute alumni
New York University alumni
University of Pennsylvania alumni